Álvaro Alejandro Melo Silvera (born May 13, 1979) is a Uruguayan footballer who plays as a forward. He has played for Uruguayan clubs Nacional, River Plate, Tacuarembó, Rentistas, Cerro, Danubio, El Tanque Sisley, Villa Teresa and Deportivo Maldonado, in China for Shanghai Shenhua, for Argentine club Olimpo de Bahía Blanca, for Colombian club Bucaramanga, for Ukrainian club FC Chornomorets Odessa and for Sportivo Luqueño of Paraguay.

Titles
 Nacional 2000 (Uruguayan Primera División Championship)

References
 
 

1979 births
Living people
Footballers from Montevideo
Uruguayan footballers
Association football forwards
Club Nacional de Football players
Club Atlético River Plate (Montevideo) players
FC Chornomorets Odesa players
Shanghai Shenhua F.C. players
Tacuarembó F.C. players
Olimpo footballers
Sportivo Luqueño players
Atlético Bucaramanga footballers
Danubio F.C. players
El Tanque Sisley players
Villa Teresa players
Deportivo Maldonado players
Uruguayan Primera División players
Uruguayan Segunda División players
Ukrainian Premier League players
Paraguayan Primera División players
Argentine Primera División players
Categoría Primera A players
Uruguayan expatriate footballers
Expatriate footballers in Argentina
Expatriate footballers in Colombia
Expatriate footballers in Paraguay
Expatriate footballers in Ukraine
Expatriate footballers in China